Acacia is a shrub or tree of the genus Acacia and the subgenus Plurinerves that is endemic to an area of northern Australia.

Description
It has prominently flattened branchlet that are angular towards the tips and covered in a fine white powdery coating. Like most species of Acacia it has phyllodes rather than true leaves. It blooms between November and February and produces racemose inflorescences with spherical flower-heads that have a diameter of  containing about 80 densely packed creamy white to pale yellow coloured flowers.

Taxonomy
The species was first formally described by the botanist G.J.Leach in 1994 as a part of the work Notes and new species of Acacia (Mimosaceae) from northern Australia as published in the journal Nuytsia. It was reclassified as Racosperma tolmerense by Leslie Pedley in 2003 then transferred back to genus Acacia in 2006.

Distribution
It is native to a small area of the western side of the top end of the Northern Territory from the Tabletop Range in the north to around the Daly River in the south growing in sandy soils as a part of open forest communities.

See also
List of Acacia species

References

tolmerensis
Flora of the Northern Territory
Plants described in 1994
Endemic flora of Australia